Samantha Soule is an American actress. She is known for her role in the Netflix series Godless, as well as Nurse Jackie, The Blacklist, The Queen's Gambit and Tales of the City.  She also appears in the Martin Scorsese film The Irishman. She is also known for her roles in Broadway plays, including Dinner at Eight, and Off-Broadway performances, which include The Other Thing and Killers and Other Family. As a film director, her movies, include Midday Black Midnight Blue, for which she also co-wrote the screenplay.

Theater
Soule performed a leading role in a theater festival in 2013 that was devoted to playwright Lucy Thurber, and was titled The Hill Town Plays. It was produced by Rattlestick Playwrights Theater, and took place in a number of theaters in New York City. Soule described the experience to The New York Times saying, "Doing one play is like a novella, but this is like a novel, telling a much bigger story and asking questions that root much deeper."  Soule appeared as "Lizzie" in Thurber’s play Killers and Other Family, when it premiered in New York, and again when it was revived at Axis Theater One Sheridan Square. Soule's performance in the demanding part, a role of "terrifying physicality", was described as "Enormously powerful and deeply moving."

Soule appeared off-Broadway in The Other Thing, a new play written by Emily Schwend, and produced by the Second Stage Theater. In it she gives a "mesmerizing performance as a woman in constant battle with her own demons." It was a "truly terrifying performance", according to one reviewer. Variety describes Soule as "a riveting onstage presence".

In A. R. Gurney’s play The Dining Room, at the Clurman Theater in New York, she and the cast won a Drama Desk Award for Outstanding Ensemble Performance. The CurtainUp review said of her, "Samantha Soule is multiple-wonderful: as a shy, wide-eyed teenager...as a young wife and mother who wants to put life with her husband (as well as her Lesbian lover) behind her and come home...and, most touchingly, as a grandmother with signs of Alzheimer’s."

Film and television
Soule appears in films including No Retreat, How We Got Away with It, and The Irishman―which stars Robert Deniro, is directed by Martin Scorsese. The Irishman is considered "one of his best films".

Soule's appearances on television include Nurse Jackie, The Blacklist, and Law & Order: Special Victims Unit. She appears in the miniseries The Queen's Gambit as Miss Jean Blake, in Tales of the City as Inka, and in the Netflix series Godless as Charlotte Temple. Godless, produced by Steven Soderbergh, is a Western that focusses on the women's experience.

As a film director, Soule's films include Birdwatching and Midday Black Midnight Blue.  She also stars in, and wrote the screenplay for Midday Black Midnight Blue, which was nominated for Best Screenplay Award at the 2021 Anchorage International Film Festival. The film is described as "an intimate and stirring portrait of souls struggling through grief in order to at last discover something resembling solace."

Filmography

Film

Television

Videogame

Stage Credits

References

External links 
 
 Samantha Soule IBDB website
 Samantha Soule Internet Off-Broadway Database

Living people
American film actresses
American television actresses
Place of birth missing (living people)
21st-century American actresses
American stage actresses
Year of birth missing (living people)